Battle Ground School District No. 119 is a public school district in Clark County, Washington, United States. It serves the communities of Amboy, Battle Ground, Brush Prairie and Yacolt.

As of the 2011–2012 school year, the district has an average enrollment of 12,318 full-time-equivalent students.

Schools

Comprehensive high schools
Battle Ground High School
Prairie High School

Middle schools
Amboy Middle School
Chief Umtuch Middle School
Daybreak Middle School
Laurin Middle School
Maple Grove Middle School
Pleasant Valley Middle School
Tukes Valley Middle School

Elementary schools
Captain Strong Elementary School
Daybreak Primary School
Glenwood Heights Primary School
Maple Grove Primary School
Pleasant Valley Primary School
Tukes Valley Primary School
Yacolt Primary School

Alternative schools
CAM Academy 1-12 Alternative School
River HomeLink 1-12 Alternative School
Summit View Alternative High School

External links
Battle Ground School District No. 119
Battle Ground School District Report Card
The Reflector newspaper

School districts in Washington (state)
Education in Clark County, Washington